Rothesay is a provincial electoral district for the Legislative Assembly of New Brunswick, Canada. The riding consists of the Town of Rothesay and its surroundings.

The district was created in 1994 as Saint John-Kings out of parts of Saint John County, Kings County and a small portion of the eastern edge of the City of Saint John all in and around the Town of Rothesay, a bedroom community of Saint John.  In 2006, its boundaries were reduced to be just Rothesay and its immediate surroundings so, as a result, its name was changed to Rothesay.

2012 by-election

Four-term incumbent Margaret-Ann Blaney, upon appointment as CEO of Efficiency NB, announced that she would resign the seat effective May 25, requiring a by-election to be called no later than November 25, 2012, which means an election will be held no later than December 31, 2012. On May 25, Premier of New Brunswick David Alward announced that the by-election would be held on June 25.

The incumbent Conservatives chose local lawyer and businessman Hugh John "Ted" Flemming III to be their candidate over local education council member Charlotte McGill Pierce.  Flemming is the grandson and great-grandson of former premiers Hugh John Flemming and James Kidd Flemming respectively.

Media speculated whether one of the three candidates for the Liberal Party leadership or New Democratic leader Dominic Cardy will seek the seat in this by-election as none of them held seats in the legislative assembly.  While none of the Liberal leadership candidates ran, NDP leader Cardy was acclaimed by his party. The People's Alliance of New Brunswick announced that they will not contest the election and endorsed Cardy's candidacy.

The Liberals chose retired police officer and clean water activist John Wilcox as their candidate over businessman Bill Gulliver by a margin of 81 to 49.

Sharon Murphy is the New Brunswick Green Party candidate and Marjorie MacMurray is running as an independent.

Issues 

Early media coverage of the race focussed on the controversial appointment of Margaret-Ann Blaney as CEO of Efficiency New Brunswick, a crown corporation. Several prominent Progressive Conservatives backed away from the issue with Finance Minister Blaine Higgs demurring "it's certainly incumbent on me, and it's incumbent on my colleagues, to respect the decision that the premier makes," and PC candidate Hugh John "Ted" Flemming III stating "I wasn't there." Premier David Alward, at the time of her appointment said "I have full confidence that I have the best person for the job," and Blaney noted that her motivation for taking the post arose in part from a desire to spend more time closer to family in the Saint John area, after a difficult year. The appointment was criticized as political patronage by the New Brunswick Liberal Association and the New Brunswick New Democratic Party who noted that prior to Blaney accepting the $150,000-175,000 per year position it had been carried out by the deputy minister of Environment and Local Government at no additional cost to the taxpayer. Deputy Premier Paul Robichaud offered competing explanations for the appointment suggesting that the deputy minister of Environment and Local Government responsibilities over Efficiency New Brunswick was only "a temporary position." Dominic Cardy, the New Democratic candidate, proposed a bill to end political patronage that would require positions such as CEO of Efficiency New Brunswick to be publicly competed.

Members of the Legislative Assembly

Election results

Rothesay

Saint John-Kings

* This was a new district established in the New Brunswick electoral redistribution, 1994, when the old riding of Kings West was split between Hampton-Belleisle, Saint John-Kings and Kennebecasis.

References

External links 
Website of the Legislative Assembly of New Brunswick
Map of Rothesay riding as of 2018

New Brunswick provincial electoral districts